Michael Ameyaw (born 16 September 2000) is a Polish professional footballer who plays as a winger for Ekstraklasa club Piast Gliwice.

Career

In 2018, Ameyaw signed for Polish II liga side Widzew Łódź after trialing for Feyenoord, one of the most successful clubs in the Netherlands. On 20 May 2021, he completed a move to Piast Gliwice, signing a three-year-deal.

References

External links

 
 

2000 births
Polish footballers
Polish people of Ghanaian descent
Ekstraklasa players
Widzew Łódź players
I liga players
II liga players
Bytovia Bytów players 
Piast Gliwice players 
Footballers from Łódź
Association football midfielders
Living people